Volodymyr Selivanov or Vladimir Selivanov (born 5 November 1945 in Izhevsk, Soviet Union, now Russia) is a Ukrainian jurist, researcher and politician. In 1992 - 1993 he served as a secretary of the Council of National Security of Ukraine.

References

External links
 Ukraine official. Council of National Security and Defense of Ukraine. Ukrinform. 21 December 2000
 Historical background about the Council of National Security and Defense of Ukraine. Council of National Security and Defense of Ukraine

1945 births
Living people
People from Izhevsk
University of Kyiv, Law faculty alumni
Ukrainian jurists
Koretsky Institute of State and Law research associates
Secretaries of National Security and Defense Council of Ukraine
Russian emigrants to Ukraine